Andrew Gardner (1888 – 2 June 1934) was a Scottish professional footballer who made 151 appearances in the Football League for Lincoln City either side of the First World War. He played as a centre half. Before moving to England he played for junior club Petershill.

References

1888 births
1934 deaths
Footballers from Airdrie, North Lanarkshire
Scottish footballers
Association football defenders
Lincoln City F.C. players
English Football League players
Date of birth missing
Place of death missing
Association football midfielders
Petershill F.C. players
Scottish Junior Football Association players